Aleksander Delchev (born 15 July 1971) is a Bulgarian chess player and writer. He was awarded the title of Grandmaster by FIDE in 1997.
Delchev won the Bulgarian Chess Championship in 1994, 1996 and 2001. He played for the Bulgarian national team in the Chess Olympiads of 1994, 2000, 2002, 2004, 2006, 2008, 2010 and 2012 with a performance of 64.6% (+36=34-12).

Selected tournament victories include the European Junior Chess Championship (1991–1992), the 47th Reggio Emilia chess tournament (2004–2005), the 4th Open Master at the Sixth International Chess Festival in Benidorm (2007), the International Open Championship of Croatia (2007) and the Open International Bavarian Chess Championship in Bad Wiessee (2005 and 2013). In 2011 he tied for 2nd-7th with Julio Granda, Ivan Šarić, Pablo Almagro Llamas, Maxim Turov and Mihail Marin at the 31st Villa de Benasque Open.

Books

References

External links
Aleksander Delchev chess games at 365Chess.com

1971 births
Living people
Chess grandmasters
Chess Olympiad competitors
Chess writers
Chess players from Sofia